The Korang River is a stream in Punjab, Pakistan. It originates from Murree Hills and flows towards Islamabad. Korang Stream along with some other small streams coming from Margalla Hills have been set to form the artificial Rawal Lake in Islamabad. Korang River is the outlet stream of Rawal Dam. This stream crosses Islamabad Express Highway from between Korang Town and Judicial Colony. The terrain of this stream is eye catching and the Loi Bhair Wildlife Safari Park is located on the beautiful terrain of the left bank of Korang Stream. Onward, this stream joins Soan River before reaching the Grand Trunk Road. Just after this point, Lai Nullah also joins Soan River.

References

 Environment.gov.pk: Dam & reservoir on Korang River

Rivers of Punjab (Pakistan)
Landforms of Islamabad
Indus basin
Rivers of Pakistan